Hovind is a Norwegian surname. Notable people with the surname include:

 Carl Oscar Hovind (1901–1982), Norwegian chess player
 Kent Hovind (born 1953), American Christian fundamentalist evangelist
 Tron Erik Hovind (born 1956), Norwegian politician

Norwegian-language surnames